Kent Whealy (April 27, 1946 – March 23, 2018) was an American activist, journalist and philanthropist who co-founded Seed Savers Exchange and promoted organic agriculture and the  saving of heirloom seeds.  Raised in Wellington, Kansas he was inspired by the works of agricultural geneticists Jack Harlan and H.Garrison Wilkes to use his training in communications to promote the protection of genetic diversity in agriculture.

Career
Kent Whealy graduated from the University of Kansas in 1969 with a degree in journalism.  He started a family garden in 1975 which through various land acquisitions he helped developed into the Heritage Farm six miles north of Decorah, Iowa growing nearly 2,000 varieties of vegetables.

In 1990, Whealy received a Fellowship from the MacArthur Fellows Program for his  work in agriculture. Whealy was also awarded the N. I. Vavilov medal from the Vavilov Institute in St. Petersburg.
In 1981, Kent Whealy first used the word 'heirloom' in regard to seeds, using it to describe beans that his friend gave him.

Seed Savers Exchange
Whealy co-founded Seed Savers Exchange, Inc. in 1975, with then wife Diane Ott publishing an annual yearbook identifying heirloom seed varieties available for sale in North America.  The organization evolved into a private seed bank, collecting and saving heirloom varieties of vegetable, fruit and grain seeds. In 1985, the group extended its reach to include maintaining an ancient rare breed of White Park cattle.
Whealy left Seed Savers board in 2007. By the time of his split with the organization Whealy and then former wife Dianne Ott were credited with helping to create one of the largest nongovernmental seed banks with more than 25,000 varieties.

Ceres Trust
In 2009 Whealy became a trustee with the Ceres Trust. Via the Ceres Trust Whealy funds research and advocacy campaigns in support of organic agriculture.  Their initiatives include academic research and consumer education campaigns including funding for the production and promotion of documentaries including Sandra Steingraber's movie Living Downstream on the dangers of pesticides and The Vanishing of the Bees on the role pesticides play in Colony Collapse Disorder, and other advocacy in partnership in support of organic agriculture with the Pesticide Action Network advocacy group.

JAK KAW Press
In 2015 Kent Whealy formed his own publishing company (JAK KAW Press, LLC) to ensure that Dan Bussey's extensive research on apples and the appropriate pomological watercolors are recorded for posterity.  This new publishing venture is dedicated to creating books that celebrate the diversity of our food crops.  The Illustrated History of Apples in the United States and Canada, already being heralded as a pomological classic, is designed to comprehensively record and illustrate our food crop heritage in rich detail, thus helping to rescue and popularize the historic varieties that still exist.

Advocacy
Whealy was an outspoken supporter of organic agriculture and the Slow Food movement and critic of  pesticides and genetically modified crops calling their use "immoral."  In 2012, he was listed among the largest financial donors in support of a California ballot initiative campaign to label foods derived from genetically engineered plants and animals.

Bibliography

References

1946 births
Living people
Technical writers
MacArthur Fellows
University of Kansas alumni
People from Wellington, Kansas